Eliza Joenck Martins (born January 1, 1982) is a Brazilian model and actress.

Biography 

Her career began at age 16 to be discovered by Anderson Baumgartner, co-owner of Way Model. From there began traveling the Brazil and the world. Having already done work for major brands and international brands, such as L'Oréal, Diesel, Fillity, Valisère, Bob Store, Amsterdam Sauer, Equus, Christian Dior, Audi, Victoria's Secret, among others. Was the cover Trip in 2008 and revised status in 2012.

In 2007 participated in the film If all else fails director José Eduardo Belmonte, where she played herself.

References

1982 births
Living people
People from Florianópolis
Brazilian female models
Brazilian film actresses
Brazilian bloggers
Brazilian women bloggers
Brazilian emigrants to the United States
21st-century Brazilian women writers
21st-century Brazilian writers